Shafi is an Indian actor known for his works in Telugu cinema, Tamil cinema, and Hindi cinema. An alumnus of National School of Drama, Shafi won Filmfare Award for Best Villain – Telugu for his debut Telugu film, Khadgam directed by Krishna Vamsi in 2002.

Shafi then played the lead role along with Nandita Das in the film Kamli directed by K. N. T. Sastry, which won the National Film Award for Best Feature Film in Telugu for that year. His other awards include Cine Goers Award for best supporting actor for the film Chatrapathi directed by S. S. Rajamouli, and Bharathamuni Award for Best Supporting Actor for the film Khaleja directed by Trivikram Srinivas.

Filmography 

 Khadgam (2002) as Azhar
 Run (2004) in a Guest appearance
 Praanam (2003) as Uma's brother's nephew
 Varsham (2004) as Kaasi
 Danger (2005) as Gattayya's brother
 Chhatrapati (2005) as Ashok / Akash
 Maayajaalam (2006) as Chhatrapati
 Nuvve (2006)
 Kamli (2006) as Redya
 Dhee (2007) as 
 Maharajasri (2007) as 
 Bheemaa (2008) as Chinna's friend
 Ready (2008) as Nagappa
 Firaaq (2008) as Ghogha
 Thenavattu (2008) as Santhosh
 Sindhanai Sei (2009) as Shankar
 Katha (2009) 
 Current (2009) as Shafi
 Shh (2009) as 
 Kutti Pisasu (2010) as Mandramoorthy
 Khaleja (2010) as Sidhappa
 Telugammayi (2010) 
  Killer (2010) 
 Golconda High School (2011) as Madhu Babu
 Wanted (2011) as Raja
 Prema Kavali (2011) as Babji
 Dookudu (2011) as Qadir
 Julayi (2012) as Lala
 Balupu (2013) as Kaasi
 Kiss (2013) as Murthy
 Sahasra (2013) as Chinappa
 Baadshah (2013) as Baadshah's henchman
 Jaihind 2 (2014) as Chandru
 Pilla Nuvvu Leni Jeevitham (2014) as Journalist Shafi
 A Shyam Gopal Varma Film (2015) as Shyam Gopal Varma
 Sher (2015) as Chotu
 Shivam (2015) as Mustafa
 Mister (2017) as Sadasiva Rayalu
 Yuddham Sharanam (2017) as Selvam
 12-12-1950 (2017)
 Hyderabad Love Story (2018)
 Rangu (2018)
 Akshara (2019)
 Brochevarevarura (2019) as Constable Ashok Kumar
 Run (2020)
 Drushyam 2'' (2021) as Janardhan
 Godfather  (2022) as Murugan

References

External links

Living people
1980 births
Male actors in Telugu cinema
Male actors from Andhra Pradesh
Indian male film actors
Male actors in Hindi cinema
Male actors in Tamil cinema
National School of Drama alumni
21st-century Indian male actors
Nandi Award winners
Filmfare Awards South winners
Telugu male actors
People from Chittoor district